"These Walls" is Teddy Geiger's second single. The single was released to radio in September 2006. The song was used by the Seven Network in Australia to promote the show Prison Break.

Official versions
 "These Walls" (Album Version) - 3:43

Music video
In the music video for this song, Geiger puts on earphones attached to her iPod shuffle, plays a piano in a house, throws playing cards into a fedora hat, and starts singing. Then as the video progresses, water comes out of nowhere, and the walls of the house come down and she is seen outside on a field with a girl and Teddy is seen holding hands with the girl towards the ending describing a situation exactly similar to the song as having a broken heart.

Chart performance

2006 singles
Teddy Geiger songs
Columbia Records singles
Songs written by Teddy Geiger
2006 songs